The 1894 Wimbledon Championships took place on the outdoor grass courts at the All England Lawn Tennis Club in Wimbledon, London, United Kingdom. The tournament ran from 9 July until 18 July. It was the 18th staging of the Wimbledon Championships, and the first Grand Slam tennis event of 1894.

Champions

Men's singles

 Joshua Pim defeated  Wilfred Baddeley, 10–8, 6–2, 8–6

Women's singles

 Blanche Hillyard defeated  Edith Austin, 6–1, 6–1

Men's doubles

 Herbert Baddeley /  Wilfred Baddeley defeated  Harry Barlow /  C. H. Martin, 5–7, 7–5, 4–6, 6–3, 8–6

References

External links
 Official Wimbledon Championships website

 
Wimbledon Championships
Wimbledon Championships
Wimbledon Championships
Wimbledon Championships